Pedro de Noguera (Barcelona, c. 1580 – Lima c. 1660) was a Spanish sculptor and architect. He learned his art in Seville. In 1619 he moved to Viceroyalty of Peru and worked mostly in Lima where he executed with Martín Alonso de Mesa the choirstalls of the Cathedral.

Other works
Dead Christ (1619) (sculpture) of the Confraternity of Our Lady of Solitude (Lima).
Altarpiece of St. Francis church (1623). El Callao.
In 1635 designed the main entrance of the cathedral.

References

17th-century Spanish sculptors
1580s births
1660s deaths
Spanish Baroque sculptors
Spanish male sculptors
17th-century Spanish architects